José Ferreira may refer to:

 José Ferreira (cyclist) (born 1934), Venezuelan cyclist
 José Ferreira (fencer) (born 1923), Portuguese fencer
 José Maria Ferreira (born 1900), Portuguese shooter